Doğan Alemdar (born 29 October 2002) is a Turkish professional footballer who plays as a goalkeeper for  club Rennes.

Club career
Alemdar started playing football for Kayserispor at the age of 10.

On 12 March 2018, he signed his first professional contract with Kayserispor aged 15. He became the youngest captain of Kayserispor history when he made also his professional debut for the club in a Turkish Cup tie against Manisa FK on 19 December 2019, aged 17.

Alemdar moved to Ligue 1 club Rennes in August 2021.

References

External links
 Profile at the Stade Rennais F.C. website
 
 
 

2002 births
Living people
People from Kocasinan
Turkish footballers
Association football goalkeepers
Turkey international footballers
Turkey youth international footballers
Süper Lig players
Ligue 1 players
Championnat National 3 players
Championnat National 2 players
Kayserispor footballers
Stade Rennais F.C. players
Turkish expatriate footballers
Turkish expatriate sportspeople in France
Expatriate footballers in France